The New Zealand rough skate, Zearaja nasuta, is a skate of the genus Zearaja, found around New Zealand at depths between 10 and 1,500 m.  Its length is up to 1 m. This species has been assessed by the IUCN as of Least Concern. In June 2018 the New Zealand Department of Conservation classified the New Zealand rough skate as "Not Threatened" with the qualifier "Conservation Dependant" under the New Zealand Threat Classification System.

References

Rajidae
Endemic marine fish of New Zealand
Fish described in 1841
Taxobox binomials not recognized by IUCN